The Arab Socialist Ba'ath Party of Algeria (Hizb Al-Ba'ath Al-Arabi Al-Ishtiraki fy Aljeza'ir), is a political party in Algeria. It is the Algerian regional branch of the Iraqi-led Ba'ath Party. It is led by Ahmed Choutri.

The party is currently banned, and Choutri was forced to flee to Iraq during the 1990s because of governmental repression against the Algerian Ba'ath movement. The party sympathised with the Iraqi ba'athist insurgency and supported Izzat Ibrahim al-Douri, leader of the Iraqi branch. Following his return to Algeria in 2003, Choutri wrote The Baathist Faith of President Saddam.

References

1988 establishments in Algeria
Arab nationalism in Algeria
Ba'athist parties
Algeria
Banned political parties in Algeria
Banned socialist parties
Nationalist parties in Algeria
Political parties established in 1988
Political parties in Algeria
Socialist parties in Algeria